RU-59063 is a nonsteroidal androgen or selective androgen receptor modulator (SARM) which was first described in 1994 and was never marketed. It was originally thought to be a potent antiandrogen, but subsequent research found that it actually possesses dose-dependent androgenic activity, albeit with lower efficacy than dihydrotestosterone (DHT). The drug is an N-substituted arylthiohydantoin and was derived from the first-generation nonsteroidal antiandrogen (NSAA) nilutamide. The second-generation NSAAs enzalutamide, RD-162, and apalutamide were derived from RU-59063.

It shows 3- and 8-fold higher affinity than testosterone for the rat and human AR, respectively, and up to 100-fold higher affinity for the rat AR than the first-generation NSAAs flutamide, nilutamide, and bicalutamide. It also has slightly higher affinity for the AR than DHT and nearly equal affinity to that of the very-high-affinity AR ligand metribolone (R-1881). In addition, RU-59063, unlike testosterone and DHT, shows no specific binding to human plasma.

See also
 Cyanonilutamide
 RU-58642
 RU-58841

References

External links
Sarms & Bodybuilding
MK 677 Sarm For Research
MK 677 25mg
MK-677 Dosage, Results, Bodybuilding, Reviews, Cycle and Benefits

Abandoned drugs
Primary alcohols
Imidazolidines
Ketones
Nitriles
Selective androgen receptor modulators
Thioureas
Trifluoromethyl compounds